Phasmarhabditis californica is a nematode in the family Rhabditidae. It is a lethal facultative parasite of terrestrial gastropods (slugs and snails).

Distribution
First found in invasive slugs in the USA by Tandingan De Ley et al 2016, also known from New Zealand. Carnaghi et al 2017 finds P. california in Ireland, parasitising a slug endemic to Atlantic Europe, Geomalacus maculosus.

References

Rhabditidae
Parasites of molluscs